The women's 4 × 200 metre freestyle relay event at the 2006 Commonwealth Games was held on March 18, 2006, at the Melbourne Sports and Aquatic Centre.

Records
Prior to this competition, the existing world record was as follows.

The following records were established during the competition:

Results
The final was held at 21:50.

References

Women's 4 x 200 metre freestyle relay
Commonwealth Games
Common